Erick Keter (born 22 July 1966, in Kabarusu, Kericho) is a retired Kenyan athlete who specialized in the 400 metres hurdles. He has also been a Kenyan record holder during his career.

Achievements

External links

1966 births
Living people
Kenyan male hurdlers
Athletes (track and field) at the 1992 Summer Olympics
Athletes (track and field) at the 1996 Summer Olympics
Athletes (track and field) at the 2000 Summer Olympics
Olympic athletes of Kenya
Athletes (track and field) at the 1998 Commonwealth Games
Commonwealth Games competitors for Kenya
People from Kericho County
African Games gold medalists for Kenya
African Games medalists in athletics (track and field)
African Games bronze medalists for Kenya
Athletes (track and field) at the 1991 All-Africa Games
Athletes (track and field) at the 1999 All-Africa Games